The Quri River or  Quru Chay or Quri Chay is a river in East Azerbaijan province of Iran. It arises in the mountains east of Tabriz and joins the Aji Chay just northeast of central Tabriz. The river divides Tabriz into northern and southern parts which are connected to each other by several bridges. The two Ghari Bridges, beside each other, are the most famous and historic of the bridges over the river. The Sangi Bridge is also of historic interest.

The river is limited by two flood control walls and two southern and northern parkways calls Chaykenar Parkway, which almost bisect Tabriz through the middle to northern and southern half. The Chaykenar Parkways connect the most eastern and western parts of the city.

The name "Quri Chay" means "dry river", and at the end of the Twentieth Century the water, when present, was polluted and undrinkable.

Notes

Rivers of Tabriz
Landforms of East Azerbaijan Province